Transport Fever 2 is a business simulation game developed by Urban Games and published by Good Shepherd Entertainment. It is the third video game of the  Transport Fever franchise, and became available for Microsoft Windows and Linux on 11 December 2019 and macOS on 23 February 2021.

Gameplay
Like the series' previous games, Transport Fever 2 still focuses on the transport evolution of the past seventeen decades. However, the campaign mode rewrites the transport history in comparison to Transport Fever, and takes place across three different continents. The game also features a sandbox mode, a map editor and mod tools.

Development and release
Transport Fever 2 was announced in April 2019. It is developed by Urban Games, the developer of the Transport Fever franchise, and published by Good Shepherd Entertainment. The game was initially available for Microsoft Windows and Linux on 11 December 2019 worldwide via Steam, with a macOS version released later in February 2021. In September 2022 Urban Games announced Transport Fever 2: Console Edition would release on PlayStation 4, PlayStation 5, Xbox One and Xbox Series X and S in February 2023, alongside a free update bringing the same "enhancements" including graphical updates and increased stability and performance to the PC version.

Reception

Transport Fever 2 received "fairly positive" reviews, according to review aggregator Metacritic.

Matt S. of Digitally Downloaded rates the game 4.5 stars out of 5. He writes "It's elegantly presented and understands that some efficiencies are required for the sake of playability."

Rick Lane from The Guardian gives a 3 star with maximum 5. He compares the game with The Sims franchise of Maxis and Cities: Skylines of Colossal Order, commenting the growth of the in-game cities would bring players a lot of fun. However, despite not short of detail, he criticises the game lacks depth in certain areas.

The game scores an overall 7 points from TheSixthAxis, which suggests the game "great attention to detail for vehicles and the environment". However, on the minus side, the game does feel more or less like a refined expansion rather than a proper sequel.

As of February 2021, Urban Games suggested that the game had sold about 500,000 copies, more than the original Transport Fever.

References

External links
 
Wiki

2019 video games
Business simulation games
Linux games
MacOS games
Single-player video games
Transport Fever
Transport simulation games
Video games developed in Switzerland
Video games using procedural generation
Windows games